Seny Timothy Dieng (born 23 November 1994) is a professional footballer who plays as a goalkeeper for EFL Championship club Queens Park Rangers. Born in Switzerland, Dieng represents the Senegal national team.

Club career

Early career 
In July 2011, Dieng signed for Grasshoppers from Red Star Zurich. 

In November 2012, Dieng made his debut in adult football at the age of 17, for FC Grenchen whilst on loan from Grasshoppers. He signed his first professional contract with Grasshoppers on 1 August 2014.

In 5 August 2014, Dieng was named on the bench in a 3rd qualifying round Champions League match against Lille.

On 2 February 2016, aged 21, Dieng signed for MSV Duisburg on a free transfer but relegation to 3. Liga meant he was released months later without having made any appearances. 

Dieng left for a career in England where he went on trial with AFC Fylde, Rochdale and Barnsley.

Queens Park Rangers 
On 26 August 2016, Dieng signed for Queens Park Rangers on a free transfer until 2018.

On 3 July 2019, Dieng signed a new two-year deal with QPR, keeping him at the club until 2021.

Loan spells 
On 2 December 2017, while playing for Whitehawk (in National League South) on loan, Dieng scored a goal in the 91st minute of a game against Chippenham Town. Going up into the Chippenham box for a late corner, he headed in from 8 yards.

Dieng spent the first half of the 2018–19 season, on loan at Stevenage, making his debut on 14 August 2018 in an EFL Cup match against Norwich City.

On 10 January 2019, Dieng joined Dundee on a loan deal for the remainder of the 2018–19 season.

On 26 July 2019, having still not made a senior appearance for QPR, Dieng went out on loan again, this time joining League One side Doncaster Rovers until 4 January 2020. Dieng made his Rovers debut in an EFL Cup match against Grimsby Town on 13 August 2019. This loan was extended to the end of the season on 3 January 2020.

Return to QPR 
On 20 September 2020, Dieng signed a new four-year deal with QPR, keeping him at the club until 2024.

Dieng made his first league start for Queens Park Rangers on 26 September 2020, in a 1–1 draw at home to Middlesbrough.  Dieng was named QPR's Player of the Month on two occasions during the season, in November and January. On 17 April 2021, Dieng received a red card on the 58th minute after a late challenge on Duncan Watmore in a 2–1 away win at Middlesbrough.  Throughout the 2020–21 season, Dieng made 42 appearances and kept 11 clean sheets in his first full season for QPR. At the end of the season, Dieng was named Players' Player of the Year alongside Rob Dickie.

Dieng was handed the No.1 jersey for the 2021–22 campaign.

On 13 August 2022 he scored his first goal for the club with a last minute header to equalise away to Sunderland.

International career
In May 2014, Dieng received his first call-up for Senegal for their friendly against Colombia, remaining on the bench for the 2–2 draw.

Dieng was again called up to the Senegal team in March 2021 and made his debut on 30 March in a 1–1 draw with Eswatini as Senegal qualified top of 2021 Africa Cup of Nations qualification Group I . Dieng was subsequently named in the Senegal squad for the 2021 Africa Cup of Nations and following a positive test for COVID-19 from first-choice goalkeeper Edouard Mendy, Dieng started in Senegal's two opening matches. He kept a clean sheet in each of those appearances, actions proving to be vital given Senegal only managed 1 goal throughout the entirety of the group stages before going on to win the tournament, beating Egypt on penalties.

Personal life 
Dieng was born and raised in Zürich to a Senegalese father and a Swiss mother. Parallel to his football education at Red Star and Grasshopper Club, he completed his school education at the Sport Academy Zurich.

Career statistics

Club

International

Honours
Senegal
Africa Cup of Nations: 2021

References

External links

1994 births
Living people
Footballers from Zürich
Citizens of Senegal through descent
Senegalese footballers
Swiss men's footballers
Swiss people of Senegalese descent
Association football goalkeepers
Senegal international footballers
2021 Africa Cup of Nations players
2022 FIFA World Cup players
Africa Cup of Nations-winning players
Grasshopper Club Zürich players
FC Grenchen players
MSV Duisburg players
Queens Park Rangers F.C. players
Whitehawk F.C. players
Hampton & Richmond Borough F.C. players
Stevenage F.C. players
Dundee F.C. players
Doncaster Rovers F.C. players
National League (English football) players
Scottish Professional Football League players
English Football League players
Senegalese expatriate footballers
Swiss expatriate footballers
Senegalese expatriate sportspeople in Germany
Swiss expatriate sportspeople in Germany
Expatriate footballers in Germany
Senegalese expatriate sportspeople in Scotland
Swiss expatriate sportspeople in Scotland
Expatriate footballers in Scotland
Senegalese expatriate sportspeople in England
Swiss expatriate sportspeople in England
Expatriate footballers in England